Chonnapat Buaphan (born 22 March 2004) is a Thai professional footballer who plays as a centre back for Thai League 1 club  BG Pathum United.

Club career
Chonnapat comes from the BG Pathum United youth team and was on loan at Rajpracha from 2021–2022. The club from the Thai capital Bangkok played in the country's second division, the Thai League 2. Chonnapat made his debut there on September 4, 2021 (1st matchday) in an away game against Chainat Hornbill Here the defender was in the starting XI and played the full 90 minutes in a 1–1 draw. Overall, he completed 16 league games there while on loan and one game in the Thai League Cup. The 2022–2023 season he was loaned to the first division newly promoted Lamphun Warriors.

International career
On 16 February 2022, Chonnapat made his first four appearances for the Thailand U-23 national team during the 2022 AFF U-23 Championship in Cambodia. With the selection he lost in the final Vietnam 0–1 and was able to achieve second place.

International goals

Under-23

Under-19

Under-16

Honours

International
Thailand U23
 Southeast Asian Games  Silver medal: 2021

References

External links
 
 

Chonnapat Buaphan
Chonnapat Buaphan
Chonnapat Buaphan
Association football defenders
2004 births
Living people
Chonnapat Buaphan
Chonnapat Buaphan
Competitors at the 2021 Southeast Asian Games
Chonnapat Buaphan